Elsfjord is a former municipality in Nordland county, Norway.  The  municipality existed from 1929 until its dissolution in 1962.  The municipality included the area around the Elsfjorden and the valley leading up to the fjord.  The municipality is now a part of Vefsn Municipality.  The administrative centre was the village of Elsfjord.

History
The municipality of Elsfjord was established on 1 July 1929 when the large Hemnes Municipality was divided into three separate municipalities:  Elsfjord (population: 765), Hemnes (population: 1,077), and Sør-Rana (population: 1,708).  During the 1960s, there were many municipal mergers across Norway due to the work of the Schei Committee.  On 1 January 1962, the municipality of Elsfjord (population: 920) was merged with the neighboring municipalities of Drevja (population: 1,001) and Vefsn (population: 5,358) and with the town of Mosjøen) to form a new, larger Vefsn Municipality.

Name
The municipality (originally the parish) is named after the Elsfjorden since the fjord is a central geographical feature of the municipality. The origin of the fjord name is uncertain, but one possibility is that it comes from the Old Norse name (.

Government
While it existed, this municipality was responsible for primary education (through 10th grade), outpatient health services, senior citizen services, unemployment, social services, zoning, economic development, and municipal roads. During its existence, this municipality was governed by a municipal council of elected representatives, which in turn elected a mayor.

Municipal council
The municipal council  of Elsfjord was made up of representatives that were elected to four year terms.  The party breakdown of the final municipal council was as follows:

Mayors
The mayors of Elsfjord:

 1929–1931: Hans Jakobsen
 1932–1934: Kristoffer Elsfjordstrand
 1935–1937: Martin Svarttjønnli
 1938–1940: Levi Vatshaug
 1943–1944: P. Christian Strand
 1948–1955: Elling Sørvig
 1956–1959: Peder Dahlmo
 1961–1963: Torgeir Drevvatne

See also
List of former municipalities of Norway

References

Vefsn
Former municipalities of Norway
1929 establishments in Norway
1962 disestablishments in Norway